Ethan Bandré (born September 14, 1998) is an American soccer player who plays as a goalkeeper for Sporting Kansas City II in MLS Next Pro.

Career

Youth
Bandré attended Salina High School South, winning the 5A state championship in 2015, was named a three time KHSSCA first team all-state honoree as well as a two time state goalkeeper of the year and league MVP in 2016. He also played club soccer for Kansas Rush Academy, who he helped win two club state championships.

College & Amateur
In 2017, Bandré attended Pacific University to play college soccer. He did not play in his first year, but went on to make 23 appearances for the Tigers and was named WCC All-Academic First Team in 2019, before transferring to Northwestern University in 2020, where he competed in a further ten games.

While at college, Bandré competed in the USL League Two with Kaw Valley FC. In 2018, he made four appearances, and in 2019 made a single playoff appearance. 2021 saw him play again in the USL League Two, this time with Des Moines Menace, making two regular season appearances and two playoff appearances, helping the team to win the USL League Two Championship.

Senior
On February 18, 2023, Bandré signed his first professional contract with MLS Next Pro side Sporting Kansas City II. He made five appearances in the 2022 season. Following the 2022 season, it was announced Kansas City had exercised their contract option with Bandré to keep him at the club for another season.

Honors

Club
Des Moines Menace
USL League Two: 2021

References

External links
 Pacific bio
 Northwestern bio
 MLS bio

1998 births
Living people
American soccer players
Association football goalkeepers
Des Moines Menace players
MLS Next Pro players
Northwestern Wildcats men's soccer players
Pacific Tigers men's soccer players
Sportspeople from Salina, Kansas
Soccer players from Kansas
Sporting Kansas City II players
USL League Two players